HAHS may refer to:
 Don Hahs (born 1942), American labor leader
 Hayward Area Historical Society in Hayward, California, United States
 Hempfield Area High School, Westmoreland County, Pennsylvania, United States
 Hinds Agricultural High School, Utica, Mississippi, United States
 Hurlstone Agricultural High School, Sydney, New South Wales, Australia